is a national university in the city of Gifu, Gifu Prefecture, Japan. It is sometimes abbreviated as Gidai (岐大) or  Gifudai (岐阜大).

National University Corporation
The Tokai National Higher Education and Research System established by integrating with Nagoya University in April 2020, both are major universities in Tōkai region.

Faculties and graduate schools
The following undergraduate and graduate degree programs and courses are offered on the Yanagido campus.

Faculties
Faculty of Education
Faculty of Regional Studies
School of Medicine
Faculty of Engineering
Faculty of Applied Biological Sciences
Faculty of Social System Management

Graduate schools
Graduate School of Education
Graduate School of Regional Studies
Graduate School of Medicine
Graduate School of Engineering
Graduate School of Natural Science and Technology
United Graduate School of Agricultural Science
Shizuoka University joined with Gifu University in establishing this united graduate school.
Joint Graduate School of Veterinary Sciences
Tottori University joined with Gifu University in establishing this joint graduate school.

United Graduated School of Drug Discovery and Medical Information Science
Gifu Pharmaceutical University joined with Gifu University in establishing this united graduate school.

Notable people

Business
Toichi Takenaka, President and CEO of Astellas Pharma
Fumio Sugimori, President and CEO of Toshiba Electron Tubes & Devices

Law and politics
Kenji Manabe, Minister of the Environment (1998–1999)

Research
 Sachi Sri Kantha, Associate Professor, Gifu University

Other
Akira Komoto, artist

Gifu University in Asia
Top 100 Asia Pacific Universities (2005)by Institute of Higher Education, Shanghai Jiao Tong University, China.
Gifu University (National Rank: 25)
According to the 2012 QS World University Rankings, Gifu University is ranked  106th in Asia and 551st in the world.

Directions to Gifu University
Yanagido Campus
JR Gifu Station or Meitetsu Gifu Station to Gifu University: 30 minutes (Gifu Bus or car)
JR Nagoya Station to JR Gifu Station: 18 minutes (JR Tōkaidō Line)
Meitetsu Nagoya Station to Meitetsu Gifu Station: 30 minutes (Meitetsu Nagoya Line)
Gifu-Hashima Station (Tōkaidō Shinkansen) to Gifu University: 40 minutes (Car)
Chūbu Centrair International Airport (nearest airport) to Meitetsu Gifu Station: 55 minutes (Meitetsu Airport Line )

Note

References

External links
 (Official site)

Buildings and structures in Gifu
Universities and colleges in Gifu Prefecture
Japanese national universities
1949 establishments in Japan
Educational institutions established in 1949